Question Mark is a Canadian current affairs television program which aired on CBC Television from 1963 to 1964.

Premise
The program featured a series of conversations that explored beliefs and morals, sometimes of a religious nature. Charles Templeton featured segments on Moral Re-Armament and Malcolm Boyd, a film producer who became an Episcopal clergyman. Other topics included French Canadian culture, the potential for a Canadian motion picture industry, the National Hockey League, and suicide.

Scheduling
This half-hour program was broadcast alternate Sundays at 10:30 p.m. (Eastern) from 20 October 1963 to 26 July 1964. Horizon aired on the other Sundays.

Reception
NHL referee Red Story, an interview subject on Question Mark, later complained that his statements were omitted from the broadcast to such an extent as to provide a distorted impression of his employers.

References

External links
 

1963 Canadian television series debuts
1964 Canadian television series endings
CBC Television original programming